The Nathan Meriam House is a historic American Revolutionary War site associated with the revolution's first battle, the 1775 battles of Lexington and Concord. Built around 1705, it stands on Old Bedford Road, near its intersection with Lexington Road, in Concord, Massachusetts; the intersection is now known as Meriam's Corner.  It is one of eleven houses within the Minute Man National Historic Park that still exists today. This area was part of the former Battle Road.

History
Joseph and Sarah Meriam arrived in Concord from Kent, England, in 1638, with six children. Another, John, was born after their arrival. John and his wife, Mary, built the first home at Meriam's Corner in 1663. Their son, John, built a second home in 1691 for himself and his wife, Sarah. Another son, Joseph, built a third home in 1705. He lived there with his wife, Dorothy Brooks. It is this house, later owned by Nathan and Abigail Meriam, that is today known as the Nathan Meriam House.

Nathan and Abigail lived in the house with seven children, with ages ranging between eleven and 29. It remained in the Meriam family until 1871, at which point it was sold to Thomas Burke. In 1925, while still in the Burke family, a fire broke out at the property which precipitated a renovation. These renovations, and others done prior to the fire, are visible in today's structure; as such, the building now looks different to the original construction.

Battles of Lexington and Concord

The battles of Lexington and Concord took form before dawn on April 19, 1775. Soldiers passed by the house on their way to Concord, and again on their way back to Boston.

References

Residential buildings completed in 1705
Meriam House, Nathan
Massachusetts in the American Revolution
1705 establishments in Massachusetts
Minute Man National Historical Park